Adolfo Eastman Quiroga (born 9 August 1835–28 October 1908) was a Chilean politician and entrepreneur who served as President of the Senate of Chile.

External links
 BCN Profile

1835 births
1908 deaths
People from Ovalle
Chilean people of English descent
Chilean people of Galician descent
Liberal Party (Chile, 1849) politicians
Liberal Democratic Party (Chile, 1893) politicians
Deputies of the XIV Legislative Period of the National Congress of Chile
Deputies of the XV Legislative Period of the National Congress of Chile
Deputies of the XVIII Legislative Period of the National Congress of Chile
Deputies of the XIX Legislative Period of the National Congress of Chile
Presidents of the Senate of Chile
Senators of the XX Legislative Period of the National Congress of Chile
Senators of the XXI Legislative Period of the National Congress of Chile
Senators of the Constituent Congress of Chile (1891)
Senators of the XXV Legislative Period of the National Congress of Chile
Senators of the XXVI Legislative Period of the National Congress of Chile
Senators of the XXVII Legislative Period of the National Congress of Chile
Senators of the XXVIII Legislative Period of the National Congress of Chile